Cretzschmar's bunting (Emberiza caesia) is a passerine bird in the bunting family Emberizidae, a group now separated by most modern authors from the finches, Fringillidae.

It breeds in Greece, Turkey, Cyprus and the Levant. It is migratory, wintering in Sudan and northern Eritrea. It is a very rare wanderer to western Europe.

Cretzschmar's bunting breeds on sunny open hillsides with some bushes. It is mainly coastal or insular, and often breeds at lower levels than the closely related ortolan bunting where both occur. It lays four to six eggs in a ground nest. Its natural food consists of seeds and when feeding young, insects.

This bird is smaller than ortolan. The breeding male has a grey head with orange moustaches. The upperparts are brown and heavily streaked, except on the rump, and the underparts are rusty orange. The stout bill is pink.

Females and young birds have a weaker head pattern, and are more similar to ortolans. They can be distinguished by the warm brown rump and white eye-ring.

The English name commemorates the German physician and scientist Philipp Jakob Cretzschmar who founded the Senckenberg Natural History Museum. The genus name Emberiza is from Old German Embritz, a bunting. The specific caesias is from Latin caesius, "bluish-grey".

References

External links
 Cretzschmar's bunting From Turkey
 Oiseaux photo

Cretzchmar's
Birds of Southern Europe
Birds of Western Asia
Birds of East Africa
Cretzschmar's bunting